Xiaoliguang is a monotypic genus of Phrurolithidae spiders, first described by Lin & Li in 2023. Its single species, Xiaoliguang huarong is distributed in Vietnam.

References 

Phrurolithidae
Spiders of Asia
Phrurolithidae genera
Monotypic Araneomorphae genera